Chandraguptha Chanakya is a 1940 Indian Tamil language historical drama film produced and directed by C. K. Sachi, starring Bhavani K. Sambamurthy and N. C. Vasanthakokilam.

Storyline
Chandragupta Maurya is the founder of the Maurya Empire. His advisor was Chanakya who is traditionally identified as Kautilya who authored Arthashastra. The film brought alive these two personalities.

Cast
Bhavani K. Sambamurthy as ChandraguptaN. C. Vasanthakokilam as Princess ChaayaBrihadambalT. K. KalyanamS. S. Kokko and P. Saradambal

Soundtrack
Papanasam Sivan composed the music. N. C. Vasanthakokilam, who is an accomplished musician rendered a few songs.

References

External links
 
 - Bhavani K. Sambamurthy
  - A song from the film

1940 films
1940s Tamil-language films
Indian black-and-white films
Indian historical drama films
1940s historical drama films
1940 drama films